Hypocrita bleuzeni is a moth of the family Erebidae. It was described by Hervé de Toulgoët in 1990. It is found in Venezuela.

References

 

Hypocrita
Moths described in 1990